Mela Huseynê Bateyî (born Hussein, 1417–1495) was a Kurdish poet and cleric. He laid the foundations for Kurdish mawlid literary genre since almost all Kurdish mawlids are influenced by him.

Biography 
Not much is known about the life of Bateyî; most information stems from  Alexandre Jaba and Mahmud Bayazidi. He belonged to the Ertuşi tribe and was born in the village of Batê in Elkî.

Works
His main work is called Mewlûda Kurmancî meaning Birthday in Kurmancî, written in Kurmanji Kurdish. The work is a celebration of the birth of Muhammad and contains 19 chapters. It was used as a textbook for teaching Kurdish in the past and was also very popular among Muslim Kurds in northern Kurdistan who could recite its poems by heart. Its poems are also recited at other occasions such as in charity. This book was published for the first time in 1905 in Egypt. It was published for the second time in 1919 in Istanbul. One of his poems, which is about morality, has become a part of the oral tradition of Yazidis. He also has ghazals.

Bateyî school 
Because Bateyî became so influential in subsequent Kurdish mawlid poetry, one can talk of a Bateyî school. These poems all start with basmala and hamdala, all of them mention the birthday of Muhammad melodically. It is recommended to recite their salawat with chorus and prosody to escape eternal hell fire.

Notes

Bibliography

External links
Mewlûda Kurmancî, Pencinar Publishers for Kurdish Culture, Sweden, in Kurdish
Melayê Batê in "Famous Kurdish poets, writers and philosophers", NavKurd, in Kurdish 
Melê Bateyî, Mewlûda Kurmancî, kurdî/kurmancî, Roja Nu Publishers, Sverige/Stockholm, 1987, 64 rûpel, .

1417 births
1495 deaths
Kurdish poets
Kurdish people from the Ottoman Empire
Yazidi culture
People from Şırnak Province
15th-century Kurdish people